Te Raukura, otherwise known as Te Wharewaka o Poneke ("the waka house of Wellington") is a building located on Taranaki Street Wharf, Wellington waterfront, New Zealand. It houses a conference venue (whare tapere), Karaka Cafe (whare kai), and waka house.

History

Te Raukura, Te Wharewaka o Pōneke is located on the Wellington waterfront, between the Civic Centre and Museum of New Zealand Te Papa Tongarewa on the lagoon known as Te Whai Repo (adjacent to Frank Kitts Park). Other attractions in our immediate area are the Wellington Museum, the City Gallery, and a variety of cafes and bars.

Te Raukura is of special significance to descendants from Taranaki iwi of Te Atiawa, Taranaki, Ngati Ruanui, Ngati Tama and Ngati Mutunga.  Previously the area where the building is located was harbour frontage to Te Aro Pā, one of the largest Māori communities in Wellington up until the 1880s.  The building sees the re-establishment of a Māori presence on Taranaki Wharf, notably absent on the waterfront since that time.

Te Wharewaka o Pōneke was officially opened at a dawn ceremony on Waitangi Day, Sunday 6 February 2011.

The unique building design is based on a korowai (cloak), signifying mana and prestige. The korowai roofline recalls the traditional sails of the waka fleet and is home to waka (canoes).  The elements of the building include whakairo or carvings and modern renditions of traditional design which transform the building symbolically into a ceremonial waka (canoe) linked to the ancestor Kupe and the voyaging traditions of the Pacific peoples.  Many of these facets about the building and the landscape are conveyed in the korero (stories) as part of the waka and cultural walking tours.

Traditional waka have been reintroduced into Te Whanganui a Tara (Wellington) in recent times with the arrival of the waka taua Te Rerenga Kotare and the waka tete Te Hononga. The most recent addition to the waka fleet is Poutu, named after the late Sam Jackson (Poutu Wipa). With its fibreglass hull, Poutu will be used more regularly for the waka tours, alongside Te Hononga. Te Rerenga Kotare remains for ceremonial occasions such as Waitangi Day, ANZAC Day and Matariki. The waka were built under the guidance of Master Carver, Hector Busby and are made out of swamp kauri.

Te Rerenga Kotare 
Waka taua are the largest and most elaborate of the single hull carved waka used by Māori for ceremonial engagements and in the past as war canoes. The waka taua has an elaborate carved prow called the tau ihu with a large variety of designs such as this highly stylised prow from Taranaki. The hull of the waka has been formed by a single log with the size of the waka determined by the size of the log. When the waka is used in ceremonial occasions it has two poles protruding from the prow covered with feathers called ihiihi. It has two large ‘eyes’ or karu atua through which the way ahead is viewed.  The presence of a waka taua signifies self-determination, prestige and strength. The name, Te Rerenga Kōtare (flight of the kingfisher), refers to the native kingfisher, a bird that strives to complete tasks and protect its own.  When the kingfisher takes flight, it is strong, balanced, focused and effortless.

The waka carries a crew of male kaihoe/paddlers of around 18-20 and is used around Te Whanganui a Tara/Wellington Harbour and at times to other places for waka regatta. For ceremonial occasions the kaihoe on the waka will wear traditional pake or raincapes which tie around the shoulders of the paddlers.

Te Hononga 
'Te Hononga’ and ‘Poutu’ are waka tētēkura, or canoes that embody the hopes, dreams and aspirations of our ancestors. These waka stand as an acknowledgement of the relationship between Māori and all races, a relationship that includes and accepts all people regardless of where they originate from. As both men and women are welcome on this waka it is envisaged that the unification of people, the environment, communities and goodwill will elevate the pride and prestige of Wellington.

Waka tētēkura are multipurpose canoes used for fishing and transportation.  Te Hononga is less elaborately carved than Te Rerenga Kōtare.  It has a distinctive prow known as a tētē. The bow piece typically takes the form of a face with a protruding tongue.  The name "Te Hononga", means to bind together and form alliances.  Traditionally the main purpose of the waka tētēkura was for fishing, and as a work horse waka to transport people and goods. Nowadays it is a multipurpose waka able to be paddled by both men and women. It has a distinctive prow known as a tētē. The bow piece typically takes the form of a stylised face with a protruding tongue, described as tētē, or pakoko, by which the vessel is classified.  The hiwi or hull of the waka is made from an ancient kauri tree recovered from the swamps of Te Taitokerau/Northland.

Poutu 
Poutu was launched on Waitangi Day 2014 and built in remembrance of Kaumatua Sam (Poutu Wipa) Jackson. This waka is lively and a pleasure to be on board. A little more comfortable, the hull is fibreglass and has beautifully carved Ihu and Taurapa. Poutu is constructed of fibre-glass for strength, durability, lightness and for the comfort of the users. Each paddler has considerable leg-room and can be comfortably seated. This waka has buoyancy compartments through the centre of the waka and at each end which keep it afloat even if filled with water.

References

External links

Buildings and structures in Wellington City
Taranaki Whānui ki te Upoko o te Ika